The Amethyst Incident, also known as the Yangtze Incident''', was a historic event which involved the Royal Navy ships , , , and  on the Yangtze River for three months during the Chinese Civil War in the summer of 1949.

 Description 
On 20 April 1949, during the Chinese Civil War between the nationalist Kuomintang-led Republic of China and the Chinese Communist Party, commanded by Lieutenant Commander Bernard Skinner, was cruising on the river Yangtze from Shanghai to Nanking, to replace , which had been posted as guard ship for the British Embassy there. According to the Royal Navy, at about 08:31, after a burst of small arms fire, a People's Liberation Army (PLA) field gun battery on the north bank of the river fired a salvo of ten shells to warn  Amethyst to stay away from the war zone. The salvo fell well short of the ship, and was assumed by the ship's officers to be part of a regular bombardment of Nationalist forces on the south bank. Therefore, Amethyst ignored the warning and continued to cruise towards Nanking. Speed was increased, and large Union flags were unfurled on either side of the ship, after which there was no more firing from this battery. 

Initial damage and grounding
At 09:30, as the frigate approached Kiangyin, (now known as Jiangyin) farther up the river, it received sustained fire from a second PLA battery, as the PLA may have considered the frigate had violated the "stay away warning" from the war zone; additionally, the PLA may have thought Amethyst might attack and therefore began firing without having been fired upon.

The first shell passed over the ship. Then the bridge, wheelhouse, and low power room were hit in quick succession, Lieutenant Commander Skinner was  wounded mortally, and all the bridge personnel were disabled. The coxswain on the wheel, Leading Seaman Leslie Frank, was injured seriously and as a result the ship slewed to port and grounded on the river's bank. Before the ship grounded, the order to open fire had been given, but when the director layer pulled the firing trigger, nothing happened because the firing circuits were disabled when the low power room was hit.

First Lieutenant Geoffrey L. Weston assumed command of the vessel, although he was also wounded himself. PLA shells exploded in the sick bay, the port engine room, and finally the generator, just after the injured Weston's last transmission: "Under heavy fire. Am aground in approx. position 31.10' North 119.20' East. Large number of casualties".

The order was given to fire in local control with each turret firing independently, but Amethyst had grounded in such a way that neither of the two forward gun turrets could bring their guns to bear on the PLA batteries, leaving the single stern turret to return fire. This turret was soon hit and disabled. None of the close-range weapons could be brought to bear on the PLA batteries. The shore batteries continued to bombard Amethyst causing more damage and casualties aboard.

Attempted evacuation
Some time between 10:00 and 10:30, Weston ordered the immediate evacuation to shore of anyone who could be spared. A boat was manned to take people the short distance to shore and some men swam ashore. The Communist batteries switched their fire to the men being evacuated and further evacuation was stopped. Fifty-nine ratings and four Chinese mess boys made it to the Kuomintang-controlled southern bank, but two men were assumed drowned while swimming ashore. Those who survived were joined by the seriously wounded from Amethyst who had been landed by sampan, with the assistance of the Chinese Nationalists the next day.  Both parties were taken to a missionary hospital in Kiangyin, where they were met by a party from the British Embassy in Nanking, and put on a train for Shanghai. Remaining aboard were about 60 unwounded men. The shelling had stopped, but no one could move on deck without drawing the attention of PLA snipers.

Assistance from Consort
By the time the shelling stopped at about 11:00, twenty-two men had been killed and thirty-one wounded. Amethyst had received more than fifty hits and holes below the waterline were plugged with hammocks and bedding. The flag officer, second in command, Far East Station, ordered the destroyer Consort (Commander Robertson) to go from Nanking, to Amethysts assistance, and ordered the frigate  (Captain Jay) to go from Shanghai to Kiangyin,  down river from Amethyst. The destroyer Consort was sighted, flying seven White Ensigns and three Union flags, steaming down from Nanking, at .Consort reached Amethyst at about three o'clock in the afternoon and was immediately bombarded. The shelling was too heavy to approach Amethyst and Consort therefore passed the other boat at cruising speed down river. Consort then turned  and again closed on Amethyst to take the boat in tow, but Consort was again bombarded so intensely that it was obliged to abandon the attempt, although it answered the shore batteries with its full armament (including  guns) and soon signaled that it had silenced most of the opposition. Half an hour later Consort made a second attempt to take Amethyst in tow, having turned downstream again. This attempt also failed and Consort sustained further damage and casualties during which the boat's steering was affected. Consort therefore had to continue downstream out of the firing area with ten men killed and twenty-three wounded.

Refloating and the arrival of Lieutenant Commander KeransAmethyst was re-floated just after midnight on 21 April, after the ship was lightened, and it moved up river. The Assistant British Naval Attaché, Lieutenant Commander John Kerans, joined the ship on 22 April, after he had dealt with all the wounded and unwounded men who had been sent ashore. He assumed command of the ship that day.

During the next few days Amethyst moved several times, but each time it moved the batteries bombarded the ship which was finally forced to anchor off Fu Te Wei.

Attempted assistance from London and Black Swan
On 21 April, a signal was received: "HM ships  and Black Swan are moving up river to escort the Amethyst down stream. Be ready to move." The cruiser London and the frigate (ex-sloop) Black Swan were bombarded intensely as they attempted to help Amethyst, and retreated with 3 killed and 14 wounded.

 Negotiations 
On 30 April 1949, the Chinese Communists demanded that Britain, the United States, and France quickly withdraw their armed forces from any part of China. During the negotiations the Communists insisted that the British ship fired first. (Eventually, in 1988, the PLA commander Ye Fei, admitted that it was his troops that fired first, thinking it was an American naval intervention). Amethyst remained guarded by the PLA for ten weeks, with vital supplies being withheld from the ship. Negotiations were ineffectual because Kerans would not accept the demand of Kang Yushao, the Chinese Communist representative, that he admit the British state had wrongly invaded Chinese national waters (the CPC insisted that it was illegal for Amethyst to cruise in the Yangtze River).

 Escape 
On 30 July 1949, Amethysts chain was slipped and the boat headed downriver in the dark, beginning a dash to escape from the Yangtze River by following in the wake of the civilian ship Kiang Ling Liberation, a fully-lit passenger vessel carrying Chinese refugees, allegedly in the hope that the observers ashore would be confused and not see Amethyst in the dark, and to follow the path through the shoals taken by Kiang Ling Liberation. The movement of both ships was spotted, and both were challenged. The Kiang Ling Liberation answered correctly, whereas Amethyst, upon being challenged, opened fire. When the shore batteries replied, a Communist gunboat in the river began to fire back at the shore. In the confusion the Kiang Ling Liberation blacked out its lights while the Amethyst sped past. The fire of the batteries was then directed at the Kiang Ling Liberation, which was sunk by the gunfire, with many civilian casualties.

At 05:00 hours on 31 July, Amethyst approached the PLA forts at Par Shan (Baoshan) and Woosung (Wusong), which had their searchlights sweeping the river. At 05:25 a planned meeting with the destroyer  occurred, at which time Amethyst sent the signal "Have rejoined the fleet south of Woosung. No damage. No casualties. God save the King".Concord had been ordered to prepare to provide gun support to Amethyst if it was bombarded by the shore batteries at Woosung. To achieve this it had moved up the Yangtze during the night, at action stations. Fortunately for the British, Amethyst was not detected by the shore batteries and the two ships then proceeded downriver until at 07:15 they ended action stations and after passing through the river's outlet arrived at the Saddle Islands at 12:00 hrs to anchor and transfer much needed oil and stores.

After a brief stay at anchor, Concord lent Amethyst some sailors to augment the ship's company, and the two ships then began voyaging to Hong Kong. Next day the cruiser  (flying the flag of the Flag Officer Second in Command Far East Fleet) and destroyer  replaced Concord as escort and proceeded with Amethyst to Hong Kong. Concord was sent to Japan, after its complement was sworn to secrecy. Amethyst subsequently received a message of congratulations from King George VI:

Aftermath
British response
Soon after, on 5 August 1949, Lt Cdr Kerans was awarded the Distinguished Service Order for his actions in bringing Amethyst to safety. 

Future Governor of Hong Kong, Edward Youde, was part of the staff of the British Embassy at Nanking. He had negotiate unsuccessfully for the release of Amethyst.  Youde was later made a Member of the Order of the British Empire for his actions.Amethyst had a ship's cat, named Simon, who was wounded seriously during the event. After receiving medical care, he recovered and continued to perform his duties catching rats, protecting the dwindling food supply during the 101-day siege and helped boost morale for the surviving sailors. Simon died soon after returning to the UK, having been awarded the Dickin Medal (sometimes referred to as "the animals' Victoria Cross"). He remains the only cat so honoured.

Chinese response
Chairman Mao was extremely pleased with the result of the incident. Peng Dehuai later remarked: "The era where Imperialists take over a piece of Asia by simply stacking a few guns is over!". Even many of the Nationalist troops on the south bank had cheered the Communists as they bombarded the British warships, and during the subsequent river crossing, many either surrendered, deserted or defected after negligible resistance.

Popular culture
The American radio series Suspense included an episode entitled "Log of the Marne" (22 October 1951), based largely on the events of the Yangtze incident.

Richard Todd played Kerans for the 1957 movie [[Yangtse Incident (1957 film)|Yangtse Incident: The Story of HMS Amethyst'''']] (in the USA released most often as Battle Hell, but also as Escape of the Amethyst and Their Greatest Glory). For the movie, Amethyst was brought out of storage to play itself. As its engines were no longer operational, a similar-looking boat, was used for pictures of the Amethyst'' moving.

Notes

References

Conflicts in 1949
1949 in China
Combat incidents
International maritime incidents
Maritime incidents in 1949
China–United Kingdom relations
Riverine warfare
Yangtze River